Damala Hagare is a town in the Sanaag region of Somaliland.

Recent History
In November 2005, the Sanaag region was reported to be experiencing water shortages, and Damala Hagare was one of the worst affected areas.

In March 2013, a peace conference between the Warsangali and Dhulbahante clans was held in Damara Hagare.

In September 2014, Somaliland's Defense Minister attempted to attend a meeting of the Warsangali clans in Hingalol, but was unable to do so and was stranded in Damara Hagale.

In May 2019, Somaliland and Puntland troops clashed in Damala Hagare. The total number of dead on both sides is estimated at nine. In June, the Somaliland army deployed troops, including armored vehicles, to Yubbe, Hadaftimo, and Damala Hagare for border security from Puntland.

In September 2019, the local community of Damala Hagare passed a resolution against charcoal production, which causes environmental damage.

Demographics
The city of Damala Hagare is unique. It is a city split into two towns or settlements. One is primarily inhabited by the Dhulbahante, mainly the Naleye Ahmed sub-lineage of the Mohamoud Garad. The second settlement is mainly inhabited by the Warsangeli clans.

References

Populated places in Sanaag
Archaeological sites in Somaliland